Chez Dominique was a restaurant in Helsinki, Finland. The chef and owner was Hans Välimäki. The restaurant was located at Rikhardinkatu 4, and seated 50 people. The restaurant closed in October 2013.

Cuisine 
Chez Dominique balanced between classical cuisine and experimental cuisine. The food had French and Finnish influences. The most popular items on the menu were four, six and nine course surprise menus. A nine course surprise menu with wines was approximately 300 euros. The restaurant also served lunch during the day.

Awards and recognitions 
The restaurant was voted 21st best in the world in Restaurant (magazine) Top 50 2009. In 2007 Välimäki said of the restaurant's status as one of the world's best restaurants, "I think this achievement proves that food is becoming more and more part of culture, and Finland does not make an exception in this development".

The restaurant was awarded one Michelin star in 2001. Since 2003 it has retained two Michelin stars.

Chez Dominique was selected as the best restaurant in Finland from 2004 to 2006.

See also
 List of French restaurants

References

External links
 
  (archived)

Restaurants in Helsinki
Defunct restaurants
Michelin Guide starred restaurants in Finland
Defunct French restaurants
1998 establishments in Finland
Kaartinkaupunki
Restaurants established in 1998
2013 disestablishments in Finland
Restaurants disestablished in 2013